"Flower Shops" is a song by American country music artist Ernest featuring country music singer Morgan Wallen. It was released on December 31, 2021 as the lead single from Ernest's second studio album Flower Shops (The Album). The song was written by Ben Burgess, Ernest and Mark Holman, and produced by Joey Moi. It also marks the two artists' first collaboration.

Promotion
In late December 2021, Wallen posted a teaser photo on Instagram of he and Ernest sitting on stools and holding guitars, captioning it "Flower Shops open at Midnight tonight".

Content
Ernest said in a press release that he created the song with Ben Burgess and Mark Holman, and explained that the song was inspired by country music singer "George Jones's sad country songs". He said: "I didn't have a hard time going there because I know damn well what it's like to run out of apologies, and though flowers aren't ever going to fix it, it's just about all you can do sometimes". Carena Liptak of Taste of Country wrote that the song tells the story of a "love that's lost and never coming back — a classic country storyline".

The song is in the key of G major with a 6/8 time signature. It has a "shuffle" tempo of approximately 44 beats per minute, and the verses are mainly based around the chord pattern G-Am-D/F-D7.

Critical reception
Chris Parton of Sounds Like Nashville commented that the song "[is] a clever, throwback duet" and "a classic done-her-wrong apology anthem".

Other versions
On February 14, 2022, Ernest and Wallen released the song's acoustic version.

Chart performance
"Flower Shops" debuted at number 68 on the Billboard Hot 100 chart dated January 15, 2022, becoming Ernest's first entry on the chart.
Despite peaking at number 64, “Flower Shops” was able to enter the 2022 Billboard Year-End at number 96, becoming the lowest peaking song to enter a year-end chart.

Charts

Weekly charts

Year-end charts

Certifications

Release history

References

2021 singles
2021 songs
Big Loud singles
Morgan Wallen songs
Male vocal duets
Song recordings produced by Joey Moi
Songs written by Ernest (musician)
Ernest (musician) songs